The Fred and Gladys Grady House on East Avenue F in Bismarck, North Dakota was built in 1920.  It has also been known as the Grover and Mabel Riggs House.  It was listed on the National Register of Historic Places in 2006.

It is asserted to be "an excellent and well-preserved example of the houses built by the Nonpartisan League's Home Building Association."

See also
Oliver and Gertrude Lundquist House, also a work of the Nonpartisan League's Home Building Association, in Bismarck, and NRHP-listed

References

Houses on the National Register of Historic Places in North Dakota
Houses completed in 1920
Houses in Bismarck, North Dakota
National Register of Historic Places in Bismarck, North Dakota
Bungalow architecture in North Dakota
Nonpartisan League